Li Xing (born 19 October 1962) is a Danish professor of development and international relations at Aalborg University.

Education 
Li Xing holds a bachelor’s degree in English language and literature from Guangzhou University of Foreign Languages and a master’s degree in English and international studies from Aalborg University. In 1998 he received a Ph.D. in development studies and international relations at Aalborg University.

Careers, Affiliations and Honors 
In 2003 Li Xing was employed by Aalborg University as an assistant professor. In 2006 he became associate professor and in 2012 he became professor. Starting in 2007 he made it possible to set up a study program in Chinese area studies at Aalborg University assisted by other colleagues. In 2012 he initiated and founded the double master’s degree in China and International Relations at Aalborg University in cooperation with University of International Relations in Beijing. He was manager of this joint master’s program until 2015. Besides he has had several administrative functions as chairman of the Board of Studies for International Affairs and member of the Department Council of Culture and Global Studies and member of the Academic Council of Social Science Faculty. Currently he is director at Research Center on Development and International Relations (DIR) at Aalborg University. Since 2012 he has also been Editor in Chief for Journal of China and International Relations. In 2019 he was awarded ”Teacher of the Year” by the Study Board of International Affairs. In addition, he has been very often invited to play in different media settings. 

Finally, Li Xing is Honorary/Distinguished Professor appointed by a number of Chinese universities, such as University of International Relations, Beijing Normal University, Guangdong Institute for International Strategies, Zhongnan University of Finance and Law, Huaqiao University, Guangxi University and Jiaxing University. He is often invited to visit and lecture in China and around the world.

Publications

Book series under the theme of "The Rise of China and the Existing World Order" 

 Li, Xing (ed.) (2021) China-EU Relations in a New Era of Global Transformation. London: Routledge. https://www.routledge.com/China-EU-Relations-in-a-New-Era-of-Global-Transformation/Xing/p/book/9780367562397
 Bernal-Meza, Raúl and Li, Xing (eds.) (2020) China-Latin America Relations in the 21st Century: the Dual Complexities of Opportunities and Challenges. London: Palgrave Macmillan https://www.palgrave.com/gp/book/9783030356132
 Li, Xing (ed.) (2019) The International Political Economy of the BRICS. London: Routledge. https://www.routledge.com/The-International-Political-Economy-of-the-BRICS/Xing/p/book/9781138579576 
 Li, Xing (ed.) (2018) Mapping China’s One Belt One Road” Initiative. London: Palgrave Macmillan. https://www.palgrave.com/gp/book/9783319922003 
 Christensen, Steen F. and Li Xing (2016) Emerging Powers, Emerging Markets, Emerging Societies: Global Responses. London: Palgrave MaCmillan. [[https://www.palgrave.com/gp/book/9781137561770]]
 Li, Xing (ed.) (2014) The Rise of the BRICS and Beyond: The Political Economy of the Emergence of a New World Order?  Farnham, UK: Ashgate Publisher. https://www.routledge.com/The-BRICS-and-Beyond-The-International-Political-Economy-of-the-Emergence/Xing/p/book/9781138359345
 Li, Xing and Osman Farah (eds.) (2013) China-Africa Relations in an Era of Great Transformation. Surrey. UK: Ashgate Publisher. https://www.routledge.com/China-Africa-Relations-in-an-Era-of-Great-Transformations/Xing-Farah/p/book/9781138254664
 Li, Xing and Steen Fryba Christensen (eds.) (2012) The Rise of China and The Impact on Semi-periphery and Periphery Countries. Aalborg-Denmark: Aalborg University Press. https://aauforlag.dk/shop/boeger/the-rise-of-china-and-the-impact-on-semi-periphery.aspx
 Li, Xing (ed.) (2010) The Rise of China and the Capitalist World Order. Surrey, UK: Ashgate Publisher. https://www.routledge.com/The-Rise-of-China-and-the-Capitalist-World-Order/Xing/p/book/9780754679134

Selected articles in international journals 

 Li, Xing (2020) “The Rise of China and Its Impact on World Economic Stratification and Re-stratification”, Cambridge Review of International Affairs. (e-publication ahead of the printed version)
 Li, Xing (2020) “China’s Pursuit of Soft Power: Norm Diffusion as a Soft Power Mechanism”, Advances in Applied Sociology. Vol.10 No.7. pp. 278-297.
 Li, Xing (2018) “The Endgame or Resilience of the Chinese Communist Party's Rule in China: A Gramscian Approach”, Journal of Chinese Political Science. Volume 23, Issue 1. Pp. 83-104.
 Li, Xing (2016) “Understanding China’s Economic Success: “Embeddedness” with Chinese Characteristics”, Asian Culture and History, Vol. 8, No. 2. Pp. 18-31.
 Li, Xing (2015) “Interpreting and Understanding ‘the Chinese Dream’ in a Holistic Nexus”, Fudan Journal of the Humanities and Social Sciences. Vol. 8, No. 4. pp. 505-520.

 Li, Xing and Timothy M. Shaw (2014) “‘Same Bed, Different Dreams’ and ‘Riding Tiger’ Dilemmas: China’s Rise and International Relations/Political Economy”, Journal of Chinese Political Science, Vol. 19, No. 1. Pp. 69-93.
 Li, Xing and Timothy M. Shaw (2013) “The Political Economy of Chinese State Capitalism”, China and International Relations, Vol. 1, No. 1. Pp. 88-113.
 Li, Xing and Jacques Hersh (2006) “Understanding Global Capitalism: Passive Revolution and Double Movement in the Era of Globalization”, American Review of Political Economy, Vol. 4, No. 1/2. Pp. 36-55.
 Li, Xing and Hersh, Jacques (2004) “The Genesis of Capitalism: The Nexus between ‘Politics in Command’ and Social Engineering”, American Review of Political Economy, Vol. 2, No.2. Pp. 100-144.
 Li, Xing (2001) “The Chinese Cultural Revolution Revisited”, The China Review, Vol. 1, No. 1. Pp. 137-165.
 Li, Xing (2001) “The Market-Democracy Conundrum”, Journal of Political Ideologies, Vol. 6, No. 1. Pp. 75-94.

Selected book chapters 

 Li, Xing (2021) “China-EU Relations at a Crossroads: Systemic Rivalry or Strategic Partnership?” In Li Xing (ed.) China-EU Relations in a New Era of Global Transformation. London: Routledge
Li, Xing (2021) “The EU’s Struggle of “Standing in Two Boats”: The Dual Complexity of the Belt and Road in China-EU Relations.” In Li Xing (ed.) China-EU Relations in a New Era of Global Transformation. London: Routledge
Li Xing (2021) “Conceptualizing ‘Meritocracy” as “Ruling Legitimacy’ in the Course of China’s Transformation and Global Rise.” In Chris Shei (ed.) The Routledge Handbook of Chinese Studies. UK: Routledge.
 Li Xing (2020) “The rise of China and the US-led world order: Can two tigers share the same mountain?” In Bart Gaens & Ville Sinkkonen (eds.) Great-Power Competition and the Rising US-China Rivalry: towards a new Normal? Finish Institute of International Affairs, Report 66. Pp. 57-71.
 Li, Xing and Zhang, Shengjun (2020) “The International Political Economy of the Rise China and Emerging Powers: Traditional Perspectives and Beyond”. In Ernesto Vivares (ed) The Routledge Handbook to Global Political Economy. London: Routledge. Pp. 74-91.
 Li Xing (2020) “China’s Global Rise and Neoimperialism: Attitudes and Actualities.” In Immanuel Ness and Zak Cope (eds) Palgrave Encyclopedia of Imperialism & anti-imperialism. London: Palgrave Macmillan. (E-publication ahead of the printed version)
 Li Xing (2020) “The International Political Economy of Emerging Powers: Attitudes and Actualities.”  In Li Xing (ed.) The International Political Economy of the BRICS. London: Routledge. Pp. 1-17.
 Li Xing (2019) “The Rise of China and the Dual Complexities of Hegemony and Counter-Hegemony.” In Li Xing (ed.) The International Political Economy of the BRICS. London: Routledge. Pp. 95-117.
 Li Xing (2019) “China’s Pursuit of the 'One Belt One Road' Initiative: A New World Order with Chinese Characteristics?” In Li Xing (ed.) Mapping China’s "One Belt One Road" Initiative. London: Palgrave Macmillan. Pp. 1-27.
 Li Xing (2019) “Understanding the Multi-facets of China’s 'One Belt One Road' Initiative.” In Li Xing (ed.) Mapping China’s "One Belt One Road" Initiative. London: Palgrave Macmillan. Pp. 29-56.
 Li Xing (2018) “World War 1 and the Chinese Revolution.” In Søren Dosenrode (ed.) World War 1: The Great War and its Impact. Aalborg: Aalborg University Press. Pp. 265-290.
 Steen Fryba Christensen and Li Xing (2016) “The Emerging Powers and the Emerging World Order: Back to the Future?” In Steen F. Christensen and Li Xing (eds.) Emerging Powers, Emerging Markets, Emerging Societies: Global Responses. London: Palgrave MaCmillan. Pp. 3-29.
 Li Xing (2016) “Conceptualizing the Dialectics of China’s Presence in Africa.” In Justin van der Merwe, Ian Taylor, and Alexandra Arkhangelskaya and (eds.) Emerging Powers in Africa: A New Wave in the Relationship? London: Palgrave MaCmillan. Pp. 77-106.
 Li Xing (2016) “From ‘Hegemony and World Order’ to ‘Interdependent Hegemony and World Reorder’.” In Steen F. Christensen and Li Xing (eds.) Emerging Powers, Emerging Markets, Emerging Societies: Global Responses. London: Palgrave MaCmillan. Pp. 30-54.

Selected media feature articles 

 Li, Xing (2021) “EU must strike balance between its values and interests”, South China Morning Post, March 4. https://www.scmp.com/comment/opinion/article/3123787/us-china-rivalry-sharpens-eu-must-strike-pragmatic-balance-between
 Li, Xing and Vadell, Javier (2021) “CHINA Y LA NUEVA COALICIÓN LIDERADA POR EE.UU.: ¿QUIÉN PAGA LOS COSTES?” [China and the New US-Led Coalition: Who Will Pay the Costs?], Agenda Pública en EL PAÍS. https://agendapublica.es/china-y-la-nueva-coalicion-liderada-por-ee-uu-quien-paga-los-costes/
 Li, Xing and Vadell, Javier (2020) “¿Estamos frente al retorno de las ‘Esferas de Influencia’ en el sistema internacional?” [Are we facing the return of the "Spheres of Influence" in the international system?], EL PAÍS, November 1. https://elpaisdigital.com.ar/contenido/estamos-frente-al-retorno-de-las-esferas-de-influencia-en-el-sistema-internacional/28872
 Bernal-Meza, Raúl and Li, Xing (2020) “EE.UU versus China: ¿nueva Guerra Fría?” [USA versus China: new Cold War?], Clarín, August 7. https://www.clarin.com/opinion/ee-uu-versus-china-nueva-guerra-fria-_0_snq8oxGdL.html
 Li, Xing (2020) “West must learn to deal with China's rise as world power”, South China Morning Post, July 7. https://www.scmp.com/comment/opinion/article/3091881/why-west-must-learn-china-not-try-change-or-destroy-it
 Li, Xing and Vadell, Javier (2020) “¿Existe una competencia China-Occidente entre sistemas políticos?” [Is there a China-West competition between political systems?], Perfil, June 6. https://www.perfil.com/noticias/internacional/existe-una-competencia-china-occidente-entre-sistemas-politicos.phtml

International keynote presentations 

 Host to the Polaris-Live (podcast) program on “The Telegram: A China Agenda for Pres. Biden." September 21, 2021. https://www.youtube.com/watch?v=K-fnJYQV8Q0&t=1025s
 Contribution to Polaris Live by Sarwar Kashmeri and his report - THE TELEGRAM: A CHINA AGENDA FOR PRESIDENT BIDEN, published by American Foreign Policy Association. April 6, 2021. https://www.youtube.com/watch?v=oPhEKiDqTsw
 Panelist “Will the Belt and Road Initiative Reshape the Global Economy and World Order in the post-COVID-19 World?” York Center for Asian Research, York University, April 29, 2021. https://ycar.apps01.yorku.ca/event/belt-and-road-initiative-theoretical-debates-asia-4/?instance_id=764
 “China-US Rivalry in Shaping the New World Order.”  A web-conference organized by PUC Minas, Brazil, and Universidad Católica de Córdoba - Jesuitas, Argentia, and Aalborg University, and Universidad Nacional de Rosario, Argentina. 10 Sep 2020
 “Exploring the Multiple Facets of China’s “One Belt One Road” Initiative under the Existing World Order.” China Council for the Promotion of International Trade. 29 Jun 2020
 “Interpreting China’s Rise in the Existing World Order”. LEANGKOLLEN SECURITY CONFERENCE. 3-4 Feb, 2020. https://www.atlanterhavskomiteen.no/leangkollen-security-conference/leangkollen-security-conference-2020
 “Mapping China’s Belt and Road Initiative: Connectivity, Diplomacy and Globalization.” Center for Science and Commercial Diplomacy, Copenhagen. 13 Nov 2019
 “The rise of China and its global impact.” (panel) The Riga Conference 2019. 11-12 Oct, 2019.https://archive2.rigaconference.lv/agenda-day1.html
 “One Belt, One Road and the Globalization of China's Political Economy.” International Center for Cultural Studies, National Chiao Tung University. 3 Oct 2019. https://www.youtube.com/watch?v=oJ9mcf7u2Lw
 “Understanding the Multiple Facets of China’s ‘One Belt One Road’ Initiative .” The 6th Annual Helsinki SummerSession. Aug 26-29, 2019. https://www.fiia.fi/en/event/6th-annual-helsinki-summer-session-us-china-relations-friction-and-engagement
 “The Emergence of a Chinese School of International Relations Theory: Constraints and Challenges?” International Symposium on International Relations: A Centennial Retrospect and Prospect. Beijing, China. 2-3 Jul, 2019.
 “The International Political Economy of the BRICS.” The BRICS Policy Center, Rio de Janeiro, Brazil. 12 Mar 2019. https://bricspolicycenter.org/en/interview-and-lecture-with-professor-li-xing-about-china-and-the-brics/
 “The multiple complexities of China’s positions in the global economy: implication to the Global South.” Brazilian Naval War College, Rio de Janeiro, Brazil. 12 Mar 2019.
 “The Rise of China and Emerging Powers: Theoretical Conceptualization.” The Brazilian Army Superior Command and Staff College, the Brazilian Naval War College, and the Brazilian War College, Rio de Janeiro, Brazil. 14 Mar 2019
 “China’s Belt and Road Initiative: Implications for Europe and Asia", Conference – China and the “Wider” Eastern Europe, University of Turku. 18 April, 2018. https://networks.h-net.org/node/22055/discussions/1726753/cfp-china-and-%E2%80%9Cwider%E2%80%9D-eastern-europe-international-conference-and
 “Understanding the Multiple Facets of China’s ‘One Belt One Road’ Strategy.” Conference - Where the Silk Road Economic Belt meets the Polar Silk Road: Nordic prospects, visions, projects. 23-24 May, 2018. https://www.asiaportal.info/event/where-the-silk-road-economic-belt-meets-the-polar-silk-road-nordic-prospects-visions-projects/

References 

1962 births
Living people
Guangzhou University alumni
Academic staff of Aalborg University